Det här är bara början is the debut studio album by Elisa's. It was released on 9 February 2011, which included a free-entrance concert at Nya torget in Mariestad. The album topped the Swedish album chart on 18 February 2011. It was also certified gold in Sweden.

Track listing

Contributors
Elisa Lindström – vocals, trumpet
Markus Frykén  – guitar
Petter Ferneman  – bass, accordion
Robert Lundh  – keyboards
Daniel Wallin – drums

Charts

References 

Elisas, Det här är bara början (album lines), 2011

2011 debut albums
Elisa's albums
Swedish-language albums